Commatica bifuscella is a moth in the family Gelechiidae. It was described by William Trowbridge Merrifield Forbes in 1931. It is found in Puerto Rico.

References

Commatica
Moths described in 1931